Orizzonti perduti is an album by Italian singer-songwriter Franco Battiato, released by EMI Music Italiana in 1983.

Track listing 

 "La stagione dell'amore" 
 "Tramonto occidentale"
 "Zone depresse"
 "Un'altra vita" 
 "Mal d'Africa" 
 "La musica è stanca" (lyrics: Franco Battiato, Tommaso Tramonti) 
 "Gente in progresso" 
 "Campane tibetane"

All songs, if not otherwise specified, music and lyrics by Franco Battiato.

Personnel
Filippo Destrieri - keyboards
Luigi Tonet - MicroComposer 
Simone Majocchi - PPG programmation
Gianfranco D'Adda - drums
Giusto Pio - violin

Franco Battiato albums
1983 albums
Italian-language albums